Summerdelics is the fourteenth studio album by Japanese pop rock band Glay, released on July 12, 2017. It was released in three versions: the regular edition with the album, a special edition with the album and two live DVDs, and another special edition with the album, four live albums and three blue rays.

It sold over 53,000 copies within less than a week, debuting at #1 both at the Oricon weekly charts and the Billboard Japan Top Albums Sales, staying in the former for 5 weeks and in the latter for 9. In the end of the year, it reached #51 at the Billboard Japan Top Albums Sales Year End 2017 and #58 at Oricon's.

Several songs of the album were used way ahead of its release date in anime, TV series and sports events. "Deathtopia" was released as a single on August 3, 2016, and both the song and its b-side "Chou Onsoku Desutini" (which is also the album's fourth track) were used as the opening themes of the anime Kuromukuro. "Sora ga Aozora de Aru Tame ni" was also used as an opening theme for an anime: Ace of Diamond. " The Other End of the Globe" was used as the opening theme for Netflix's Final Fantasy XIV: Daddy of Light. "Scoop" was used as the ending theme of TV Asahi's Onegai! Ranking.

"XYZ" was composed for the TV commercial of the Chiba leg of the 2017 Red Bull Air Race World Championship. "Long Run" was used as the official song of the 2017 Hokkaido Marathon. Also, "Supernova Express 2017" is a new version of the previously released song "Supernova Express 2016", which was used as the image song of Hokkaido Railway Company's Hokkaido Shinkansen.

Track listing

References

External links
 Album profile at Glay's official website

2017 albums
Glay albums
Pony Canyon albums